IndiePix Films, Inc is an independent film distribution and online streaming service based in New York City.

IndiePix Unlimited, the company's subscription-streaming service, uses Streamhoster to deliver the desktop version for the service, and Ireland-based DMD Max for its mobile content.

History 
Founded in 2004 by Barnet Liberman and Bob Alexander, currently the company's chairman and president respectively, IndiePix Films' business purpose is to organize, create, implement and exploit a commercial platform for the distribution of independent films. It owns a catalogue of thousands films spanning multiple genres acquired on the international festival circuit, including Cannes, Venice, Locarno, Tribeca, SXSW and Rotterdam.

On January 26, 2016, the company launched its subscription-streaming service, IndiePix Unlimited.

In December 2016, IndiePix Films teamed with Amazon Channels, opening up access for Prime members on the PlayStation and Roku platforms, along with Amazon Fire TV products.

Filmography (selected)

References 

IndiePix Films
Film distributors of the United States
Entertainment companies based in New York City
2004 establishments in New York City